The Mystery of the Druids is a single-player adventure video game developed by the German company House of Tales and published by cdv Software Entertainment. The game was first released in March 2001 for Microsoft Windows.

The story takes place in Britain, where Detective Brent Halligan, an inspector at Scotland Yard, investigates a brutal series of murders committed in England. The investigation leads Detective Halligan into a mystery surrounding the demise of the British Order of Druids and eventually takes him on a trip through time itself.

Nordic Games announced on December 5, 2014, that it had acquired the game's intellectual property.

Gameplay 

A large portion of the game-play in The Mystery of the Druids consists of discovering clues and solving puzzles. Clues are mainly found by moving the computer mouse over various objects on the screen and clicking them to add them to the inventory or gain information about them. Puzzles are often solved by combining items, using drag and drop gestures, after which the player must figure out how the newly created item is used. Many actions in the game require the completion of such puzzles, such as being able to use a telephone.

Interaction with non-player characters is accomplished through dialog trees. These conversations with non-player characters are essential to playing the game, as many of the major plot points are revealed through conversation rather than through investigating the environment.

Plot 

The Mystery of the Druids begins with a dark ceremony at Stonehenge in 1000 AD, where all but a few of the druids are enveloped in a supernatural glow before being consumed by fire.

In 2000, at New Scotland Yard in London, Detective Brent Halligan has been assigned to investigate a series of brutal murders known as the "Skeleton Murders". Assisting him with his investigation is Dr. Melanie Turner, an anthropologist at the Oxford Anthropological Museum, who, along with historian Arthur Blake, discovers that the murders match the description of cannibalistic sacrificial rites performed by Britannic druids. It is later revealed that a demonic superior druid seized power over the druids in order to force mankind to submit to his rule by performing a "final ritual", which would transfer the knowledge and power of the druids to five infants known as the "Inheritors". The ritual was not entirely completed, but the Inheritors are strong and powerful enough to complete the ritual themselves.

While investigating a lead regarding a group of neo-Druids called "The Circle", Halligan is captured and held prisoner by their leader, Lord Sinclair. Halligan escapes, but discovers The Circle performing a human sacrifice and faints. Halligan awakens at dinner and, unbeknownst to him, is eating human flesh which grants strength and power, but also makes them susceptible to brainwashing.

Turner is led to Lord Sinclair's estate through information which Halligan had left at her museum, after which she is able to sneak in to the property. She finds an artifact, the Amulet of Transformation, which may be required to complete the Final Ritual. Halligan discovers her and a fight ensues before she is able to knock him unconscious. As he awakens, he discovers that he was brainwashed. He discerns Sinclair's plan, which is to put a curse on the world in order to enslave humanity.

If Turner is noticed while trying to rescue Halligan, Lord Sinclair's security will capture her. She is brought inside, where a brainwashed Halligan, who does not seem to recognize her, informs her that she will be the guest of honor for their dinner. A few days later, the skeleton of Turner is found in a forest near London. Halligan is listed as missing and last seen leaving his Scotland Yard department.

Blake is killed by Sinclair, but he points them in the direction of the Twelve Bridges ruins. Once there, Halligan and Turner are sent back in time. Halligan stumbles on the site of the ritual and attempts to disrupt it, but is interrupted by the demonic druid Serstan, who holds Turner hostage. A staff that Halligan had found is bartered for Turner's life and a promise, on his honor, not to harm Halligan or Turner. Serstan agrees and begins the ritual, whereupon Halligan and Turner are transported back to their own time.

Halligan and Turner rush to Stonehenge where The Circle is attempting to complete the final ritual. Halligan stabs Turner with scissors and informs Serstan that the vow has been broken, causing Serstan to intervene and cause the Circle to disappear and preventing the ritual from being completed. Turner is near death, but Halligan is able to save her using magical mistletoe, after which they share a kiss.

Development 
cdv Software Entertainment revealed The Mystery of the Druids, then titled The Heirs of the Druids, to IGN on July 12, 2000. It was developer House of Tales' first release. The Mystery of the Druids was advertised as containing "50 detailed locations", "360 interactive scenes" and "20 speaking characters". It also blended "2D and 3D graphics, including character models with up to 1000 polygons."

A playable game demo was released on May 25, 2001 which featured game-play up to the Anthropology Museum in Oxford. A second game demo was released later that year on September 25, which included the time travel scene to prevent the ancient ritual which resulted in the creation of the Inheritors.

The first trailer was released on August 14, 2001 and featured game-play videos of Detective Halligan. A second trailer was released on August 30 which showcased the various locations of the game, as well as the druidic ritual which is seen at the beginning of the game. The third and final trailer was released on September 6, 2001. This trailer introduced the romance between Detective Halligan and Dr. Melanie Turner as it progresses throughout the game.

Reception

Domestic

In the German market, The Mystery of the Druids debuted at #29 on Media Control's computer game sales chart for March 2001. Alex Watson of GameSpot UK wrote that the game had become a "big hit" in Germany by July. The German publication Golem.de similarly reported that the game was "quite successful".

Writing for Golem.de, Thorsten Wiesner commented, "The exciting story and the atmospheric game design are big pluses, but deficiencies in control and some weak graphics are also clear negatives—with a little more care, The Mystery of the Druids could have been a much better title."

International

The Mystery of the Druids received mostly negative reviews. Brett Todd of Computer Games Magazine proclaimed it "poorly designed, ugly, and rife with bugs." Computer and Video Games derided its "unimaginative settings and painful dialogue" as well as its inclusion of "some of the most ridiculously complex puzzle sequences to achieve even the simplest of tasks" before deciding that it has "very little appeal for anyone but the most patient and geeky PC-head." GameSpot described its characters as "rude", its puzzles and dialogue branches as "confusing", and the game overall as "surprisingly devoid of plot." GameSpy described it as being a game that might make customers "take matters into their own hands and put the [adventure game] genre out of its misery". In a positive review, PC Zones Mark Hill wrote that the title's "closest gaming relatives are Broken Sword and the Blade Runner game, [but] Druids is far superior to both." He summarized it as "best serious adventure game in years".

Legacy
In retrospect, Martin Ganteföhr characterized The Mystery of the Druids as an important learning experience for House of Tales, despite its mistakes and many negative reviews. He said after its release:

House of Tales followed The Mystery of the Druids with The Moment of Silence in 2004, and later with Overclocked: A History of Violence (2008). In 2018, Ganteföhr worked with Daedalic Entertainment to create the game State of Mind.

See also
Necronomicon: The Dawning of Darkness
Runaway: A Road Adventure
Sherlock Holmes: The Mystery of the Mummy
The Black Mirror

References

External links 
MobyGames - The Mystery of the Druids

2001 video games
Point-and-click adventure games
Mystery adventure games
House of Tales games
Video games developed in Germany
Video games set in 2000
Video games set in France
Video games set in England
Video games set in London
Video games set in Oxford
Windows games
Windows-only games
Video games about police officers
Video games about time travel
Cannibalism in fiction
CDV Software Entertainment games